Crash is a South Korean thrash metal band from Seoul.

History
Crash was formed in 1991 with the lineup of Ahn Heung-Chan (vocals, bass guitar), Jung Yong-Wook (drums) and Yoon Doo-Byung (guitar). They were also the first Korean band to provoke slam dancing and stage diving at their concerts.

In 1993, they recorded their debut album Endless Supply of Pain with internationally famous death metal producer, Colin Richardson with whom the band collaborated again on their third and fourth albums. Endless Supply of the Pain was a critical and commercial success with more than 80,000 copies sold in 1993.

Ahn Heung-chan has also provided his backing vocals on two hardcore rap tracks of Korean pop superstars, Seo Taiji & Boys' third album.

After a more death metal-oriented second album To Be or Not to Be, original guitarist Yoon was fired from the band. Their third album, Experimental State of Fear, was recorded in 1997 with two new guitarists, taking a more experimental approach, with the introduction of an industrial aspect to their thrash sound.

They participated in the D.R.I. tribute album We Don't Need Society with a cover version of "Acid Rain" as well as a Stormtroopers of Death tribute album with a cover of "Sargent D & the S.O.D.".

On August 10, 2010, Crash released their sixth album, The Paragon of Animals, which returned to the thrash style of Crash's earlier albums and abandoned the industrial elements of the previous few albums. In its place was a groove metal style comparable to the American band Lamb of God.

The band continued to explore their thrash style in their most recent EP Untamed Hands In Imperfect World, released in 2014 by Sony Music.

Crash won the Korean Music Awards (considered as Korean Grammy Awards) for Best Rock Album in 2011.

Band members

Current members
 Ahn Heung-chan − bass, vocals (1991−present)
 Jung Yong-Wook − drums (1991−present)
 Ha Jae-Yong − guitars (1996–present)
 Lim Sang-Mook − guitars (2002−2007, 2014–present)

Former members
 Yoon Du-Byung - guitars (1991−1996, 2008−2010)
 Lee Sung-Soo − guitars (1996−1999)
 Oh Young-Sang − guitars (1999−2002)
 Lim Sang-Mook − guitars (2002−2007)
 Kim Yu-Sung − keyboards (1999−2002)

Timeline

Discography

Albums and EPs
 Endless Supply of Pain (1993)
 To Be or Not to Be (1995)
 Experimental State of Fear (1997)
 Terminal Dream Flow (2000)
 The Massive Crush (2003)
 The Paragon of Animals (2010)
 Untamed Hands In Imperfect World (EP) (2014)

References

External links
 Crash at Myspace
 Crash at Encyclopaedia Metallum

1991 establishments in South Korea
Industrial metal musical groups
Korean Music Award winners
Musical groups established in 1991
Musical quartets
Musical groups from Seoul
South Korean heavy metal musical groups
Thrash metal musical groups